Aerodrom is a neighbourhood in the City of Skopje, North Macedonia, and the seat of Aerodrom Municipality.

Demographics
According to the 2002 census, the neighborhood had a total of 72,009 inhabitants. Ethnic groups in the neighborhood include:

Macedonians = 64,391 (89.4%)
Serbs = 3,085 (4.3%)
Albanians = 1,014 (1.4%)
others.

References

External links

Villages in Aerodrom Municipality, Skopje
Neighbourhoods of Skopje